Elmer Victor Finland (July 8, 1894 – May 26, 1968) was a lawyer and political figure in British Columbia. He represented Esquimalt in the Legislative Assembly of British Columbia from 1937 to 1945 as a Conservative.

He was born in Victoria, British Columbia, the son of George Robert Finland and Kate C. Finnerty, and was educated at McGill University and Stanford University. In 1921, he married Gladys L. MacDonald. Finland served as a lieutenant in the Royal Flying Corps and the Royal Air Force during World War I. In March 1945, it was announced that he was unable to attend further sessions of the assembly because he was returning to duties with the Royal Canadian Air Force. He died in 1968.

References 

1894 births
1968 deaths
British Columbia Conservative Party MLAs
Politicians from Victoria, British Columbia
McGill University alumni